Fieldospongia is a genus of sea sponge known from the Middle Cambrian Burgess Shale. Just five specimens of Fieldospongia are known from the Greater Phyllopod bed, where they comprise less than 0.1% of the community.

Described in 1920 as Tuponia bellilineata by Walcott in his monograph on sponges from the Burgess Shale, this form has now been placed within a separate genus, Fieldospongia, erected by Rigby in 1986. The only known specimen purportedly came from the Mount Whyte Formation

References

External links
 Burgess Shale species 55

Burgess Shale sponges
Prehistoric sponge genera
Cambrian genus extinctions